Francisco Burgos (born 7 December 1999) is a New York based American actor and R&B singer. He made his first major movie appearance in a romance film Explicit Ills directed by Mark Webber where he acted in a lead role as “Babo” in 2008. In 2012, Burgos starred as "Tibbits" alongside comedian actor Johnny Knoxville and Patton Oswalt in Todd Rohal's raucous comedy film Nature Calls. Burgos has starred in several TV series including Starz TV Network's Show “Power” produced by Curtis ’50 Cent’ Jackson and in Season 6 of CBS's crime-solving TV series  “Elementary”.

Career

Acting 
Burgos was born and raised in The Bronx, New York. He started acting at a tender age with appearances in shows such ‘Sesame Street’ and ‘PBS Kids’. He made his first on screen appearance at the age of 5 following a successful auditioning for HBO's show ‘The Sopranos’. This was followed by another on screen appearance where he starred as ‘Manny’ alongside Edward Norton and Collin Farraell in the thriller cop film "Pride & Glory" directed by Gavin O'Connor. In his first lead role, Burgos starred as ‘Babo’ – a young kid with asthma in a Drama/Romance film "Explicit Ills" directed by Mark Webber and featured actors such as Rosario Dawson who acted as Babo (Burgos’) mother in the film and Paul Dano & Lou Taylor Pucci. Burgos starred as ‘Able’ in CBS’ Season 6 ‘Crime-solving Tv series, “Elementary” in 2018. He featured in the movie, The Shed released in 2019.

Music 
Burgos is an R&B singer known by the stage name Frank. He has released a number of singles including Feeling you.

Filmography

Film

References 

Living people
1999 births
American male television actors
21st-century American actors